is the highest mountain in Kōchi Prefecture, Japan, at . Situated in the town of Tosa, Mount Inamura is famous for its Akebono-tsutsuji (Rhododendron pentaphyllum) flowers, which bloom during the middle of spring season (April–May).

History
Mount Inamura is home to a historically-famous Shinto shrine dedicated to the fertility goddess Ama-no-Uzume. Hikers, upon reaching the summit are permitted to pay homage to the Ama-no-uzume by touching the divine phallus, made of Japanese cypress.

See also
 Geography of Japan
 List of mountains and hills of Japan by height

References

Views of the mountain

Natural monuments of Japan
Inamura
Inamura